Thomas Bradbury may refer to:

Thomas Bradbury (cricketer) (1859–1917), English cricketer
Tom Bradbury (born 1998), English professional footballer
Thomas Bradbury (minister) (1677–1759), English Dissenting minister